Presidential elections were held in Georgia on 5 January 2008, moved forward from autumn 2008 by President Mikheil Saakashvili after the 2007 demonstrations.

A referendum on when to hold the legislative elections was held at the same date. On 26 November 2007 the President's office announced that Georgia would hold another simultaneous referendum on NATO membership.

Saakashvili was declared a winner with 53.7% of the votes despite the accusation of electoral fraud by the Georgian opposition. International observers welcomed the elections as "the first genuinely competitive presidential election" in the history of Georgia, and said, despite observed irregularities, the elections generally met the democratic standards.

Background
In a November 2007 pre-election poll held by the weekly Mteli Kvira, the opposition candidate Gachechiladze defeated Saakashvili by 2% (18% to 16%).

In a December 2007 poll commissioned by Saakashvili's party, the BCG company surveyed of 13,000 respondents throughout Georgia showed that 29.5% of voters were still undecided. 36.7% said they would vote for Saakashvili, followed by Gachechiladze with 9.7%; Patarkatsishvili – 4.7%; Gamkrelidze – 3%; Natelashvili – 2.5%; Maisashvili and Sarishvili had less than 1% each. One percent said they would vote for none of the candidates. The survey showed that 63.5% of those who had decided to vote for one of the candidates would vote for Saakashvili, followed by Gachechiladze and Patarkatsishvili with 16.7% and 8.1%, respectively.

Another survey, also commissioned by Saakashvili's party, was overseen by the U.S. based Greenberg Quinlan Rosner Research but conducted by the Georgian ACT group.  This survey involved 1,500 respondents, 41% would vote for Saakashvili, followed by Gachechiladze – 11.1%; Patarkatsishvili – 6.5%; Natelashvili – 3.5%; Gamkrelidze – 2.1%; Maisashvili and Sarishvili – less than 1% each. 20.6% were undecided and 2.3% said they wouldn’t vote for any candidate. Of those who have decided to vote for one of the candidates, 64% said they would vote for Saakashvili, followed by Gachechiladze and Patarkatsishvili with 17% and 10%, respectively.

On December 23, 2007, the pro-opposition Imedi TV announced that the organization called Dialogue for Development of Democracy conducted public opinion research between December 17 and December 21. The survey showed, that 22.1% of the 2,100 surveyed would support Levan Gachechiladze, a presidential candidate backed by the nine-party opposition coalition, followed by Mikheil Saakashvili with 20.3%; Badri Patarkatsishvili (co-owner of Imedi TV) – 19.1%; Shalva Natelashvili, the leader of the Labor Party – 6.5%; Davit Gamkrelidze, the leader of the New Rights Party – 4.9%; Giorgi Maisashvili, leader of Party of Future – 1.1% and Irina Sarishvili, leader of Party of Hope – 0.2%. The survey reported that 21.7% remained undecided. A survey, commissioned by the Saakashvili’s campaign from the U.S.-based Greenberg Quinlan Rosner, was published on January 3, 2008. It showed that Saakashvili had the support of 42 percent among all Georgian adults, compared to 19 percent for Levan Gachechiladze, 11 percent for Badri Patarkatsishvili, 5 percent for Shalva Natelashvili, 4 percent for David Gamkrelidze, and 1 percent for Gia Maisashvili; 2 percent would not vote or vote blank, and 16 percent were undecided. The survey reported only a minority of Georgian voters felt the presidential elections would not be fair.

All major national television broadcasters plan to conduct their own exit polls and have commissioned seven local research groups.

In late December, Patarkatsishvili, who had pledged his financial support to the November rallies, became embroiled in a major controversy. The authorities accused him of trying to bribe an election official to claim voting fraud and released a series of audio and video recordings of the two separate meetings of the high-ranking Georgian Interior Ministry official Erekle Kodua with Patarkatsishvili and the head of his pre-election campaign Valeri Gelbakhiani. According to these materials, Patarkatsishvili tried to bribe Kodua to take part in what the Georgian officials described as an attempted coup d'état on January 6, 2008, the date of the scheduled presidential elections. The plan included to stage a mass manifestation against the government and to "neutralize" the Interior Minister Vano Merabishvili. Patarkatsishvili confirmed that he met with Kedua in London, but denied the bribe was in connection to a coup plot.  He claimed instead his intention was to uncover official plans to rig the election. He also confirmed that he offered Kedua "a huge amount of money" in exchange for defecting from the authorities to avert the possible use of government force against the planned January rallies. On December 26, 2007, several leading journalists defected from Imedi TV, co-owned by Patarkatsishvili. Later that day, the television station’s management announced that Imedi TV temporarily suspended broadcasts until the station's "legal status in respect of ownership is clarified." "By doing so we are distancing from dirty political games", said Giorgi Targamadze, head of the Imedi TV's political programs. The opposition politicians formerly allied with him also made attempts to distance from Patarkatsishvili and condemned what they described as illegal methods used by both the authorities and "other forces," apparently referring to Patarkatsishvili.

On December 28, 2007, Patarkatsishvili announced that he would withdraw his bid for presidency, but would remain a candidate until January 4, 2008. On January 3, 2008, he reversed himself and decided to run in presidential elections. In response, his top campaign official Giorgi Zhvania (brother of the late Prime Minister Zurab Zhvania) resigned, declaring that Patarkasishvili does not have a reputation one would expect of a country's president.

Meanwhile, the Organization for Security and Co-operation in Europe (OSCE) released two interim reports on the election campaign, saying that the "legal framework [was] generally favorable to the conduct of democratic elections in Georgia, if implemented in good faith." However, they expressed concerns about "a highly polarized political environment" within the country's political spectrum, including the allegations of Saakashvili's use of administrative resources and the lack of balance in Georgian media.

On December 28, 2007, Saakashvili vowed to lead Georgia into NATO and to restore its territorial integrity in his second term if reelected  He stated he would hand over a united Georgia to his successor after the end of his second term.

The pre-election period in Georgia was also marked with the rising tension in breakaway Abkhazia. Early in January 2008, the Georgian media reported attacks on ethnic Georgians in the Gali district controlled by the de facto Abkhaz administration. The reports said that the Georgians living in Abkhazia were being intimidated by local Abkhaz officials to prevent them from participating in Georgia's presidential election. At least seven houses owned by ethnic Georgians were destroyed by fire. Although Abkhaz officials rejected the accusations, the acting Georgian president Nino Burjanadze warned that attempts were being made to add conflict on the eve of the election.

Candidates
Badri Patarkatsishvili, a business oligarch who made a fortune in Russia, announced he would be a candidate on 10 November 2007.  The government of Georgia accused Patarkatsishvili of plotting a Russia-backed coup against Saakashvili. The opposition parties stated they would nominate a single candidate for the election, that would have a "great chance of winning the election." The nominee would not be Patarkatsishvili, former Defence Minister Irakli Okruashvili or the activist Tina Khidasheli. On November 12, the opposition parties nominated MP Levan Gachechiladze, a leader of the 2007 Georgian demonstrations, as their common candidate. The Georgian Labour Party supported its leader Shalva Natelashvili as a candidate instead of Gachechiladze, and the New Right nominated MP Davit Gamkrelidze as their candidate.

Saakashvili was nominated as his party's candidate on 23 November.

Twenty-two citizens of Georgia expressed willingness to run in the elections. According to the Georgian election code each of them had to submit at least 50,000 signatures of supporters in order to be registered by the Central Election Commission as official candidates.

In total, thirteen candidates submitted signatures, but only seven were recognized by the Central Election Commission (CEC) as eligible to run for the presidency: 
 Levan Gachechiladze, nominated by the nine-party opposition coalition
 Davit Gamkrelidze, leader of the New Right
 Gia Maisashvili, leader of the Party of the Future
 Shalva Natelashvili, leader of the Georgian Labour Party
 Badri Patarkatsishvili, a business and media tycoon
 Mikheil Saakashvili, the ex-president and the leader of ruling United National Movement
 Irina Sarishvili-Chanturia, the only female presidential candidate and the leader of the Russian-leaning Hope Party.

Conduct
In addition to local watchdogs, 29 international or foreign organizations (including OSCE, Parliamentary Assembly of the Council of Europe, and International Crisis Group) observed the elections.

Early on election day all polling stations were opened with the exception of the highland village of Shatili where heavy snow thwarted the process.

Exit polls

Exit polls
The first exit poll results were conflicting according to a survey commissioned by 4 TV stations (Georgian Public Broadcaster, Rustavi 2, Mze, and Achara TV) from the Georgian Institute of Public Affairs (GIPA), Ilia Chavchavadze State University and two think-tanks – the Caucasus Institute for Peace, Democracy and Development (CIPDD) and the Georgian Foundation for Strategic and International Studies (GFSIS).  The exit polls found Mikhail Saakashvili winning with a narrow absolute majority of 53.5% of the votes, with Levan Gachechiladze coming second with 29.1%.
Voter turnout was 46.4%. Twenty-three percent of respondents refused to say for whom they had voted. The poll had a margin of error of 2%. The figures were provisional, with final results not expected for another few hours.

According to a relatively unknown Ukrainian think tank "Common European Cause", which claimed to have interviewed 10,000 people at 200 polling stations, Gachechiladze won the most votes (31%), followed by Saakashvili (24.4%) and Patarkatsishvili (20.3%).

Results

Reactions
The opposition candidates claimed the polls were rigged and the exit-polls false. Supporters for Levan Gachechiladze were waiting for official results, but the candidate himself called for a January 6 meeting in Tbilisi to protect the true results of the election. On the 6th January about 7 to 9000 supporters of the opposition went to the Rike Square in Tbilisi. Opposition leaders urged their adherents to return on 8 January and to celebrate the victory of Levan Gachechiladze.
Meanwhile, the OSCE and EU election observers stated that the election met democratic standards, but there were problems that must be addressed. The Western observers also hailed it as "the first genuinely competitive presidential election, which enabled the Georgian people to express their political choice." In an interview with the German newspaper Frankfurter Rundschau the German diplomat Dieter Boden the head of the OSCE Election Observation Mission stated the elections were massively falsified and that there were "rude, negligent and intentional manipulations during the vote count that were detected by our observers". He spoke of a "chaotic situation" within the electoral commission. On January 10, however,  representative of the OSCE Office for Democratic Institutions and Human Rights mission in Georgia, Rasto Kuzel, declared that the OSCE has not changed its positive evaluation of the January 5 presidential election  The OSCE Office explained "Mr. Boden's published statements do not quite reflect what he really said, and we shall look into how that happened" and that "the interview was not published completely. Some definitions were cut from the interview." On January 11, Boden stated that the confusion "was the result of a journalist's misinterpretation" and said the final report would be published in February 2008.

The Central Election Committee also stated the turnout was 56.17%, or 1,912,943 voters. As announced by the Central Election Committee by 20.00 (16.00 GMT), January 6, the data from 2,605  precincts was counted. Saakashvili was in the lead with 51.95% of the votes, and Gachechiladze is second with 25.14%. According to Georgian Central Electoral Commission, as of 8 January 2008, that included the votes from more polling stations than the earlier reports, Saakashvili was leading with 52.21%, Gachechiladze following him with 25.26% of the votes. On 9 January 2007, with 98.8% of the ballots counted, Saakashvili had 52.21% meaning he could not fall below the 50% which would result in a run-off. However the opposition continued to protest the result, claiming vote-rigging had taken place and demanding a run-off, also asking for the resignation of the head of the CEC. Badri Patarkatsishvili an opposition candidate was later charged with attempting to organise a terrorist attack and plotting a coup.

On 13 January 2008, most opposition parties united in a large rally in downtown Tbilisi demanding run-off of the elections.

Conclusions of the OSCE and Georgian human rights ombudsman
The Organization for Security and Co-operation in Europe (OSCE) final report was critical of the conduct of the election.

The Georgian Human Rights Ombudsman, Sozar Subari, was highly critical of the election proceedings. In addition to identifying breaches of the law, his report stated:

References

External links
 Georgian presidential election, 2008, Electoral Geography 2.0
 Georgia Vote 2008, EurasiaNet
 Elections 2008. Civil Georgia
 Central Election Commission of Georgia 

Presidential election
Presidential elections in Georgia (country)
Georgia
Georgia